Le goût Rothschild,, describes a detailed, elaborate style of interior decoration and living which had its origin in France, Britain, Austria, and Germany during the nineteenth century, when the rich, famous, and powerful Rothschild family was at its height. The Rothschild aesthetic and life-style later influenced other rich and powerful families, including the Astors, Vanderbilts and Rockefellers, and became hallmarks of the American Gilded Age.  Aspects of le goût Rothschild continued into the twentieth century, affecting such designers as Yves Saint Laurent and Robert Denning.

Characteristics 

The decorative interior elements of the  include lavish use of extravagant heavy textile fabrics (like damask, brocade, and velvet) and much gilding, elaborate stucco ceilings, and precious (and often antique) wooden panelling and parquet flooring.  This heavy abundance is combined with eighteenth-century, mostly French, furniture.  For the Rothschilds, furniture and works of art often were of royal provenance.  The family bought only the best which was on the market at that time, with preference for the reigns of Louis XIV, Louis XV, and Louis XVI.  And not so long ago after the French Revolution in 1789, there were some excellent pieces to buy, including many from the Château de Versailles.  In architecture, the Rothschilds preferred styles of the Renaissance.  The fusion of these uses of materials and styles, "the Rothschild style", combines a sense of Victorian horror vacui beside masterworks of art, sculpture, and armour.

With the construction of Waddesdon Manor, the newly established English branch of the Rothschild family revived imitation of French Renaissance styles in the United Kingdom.  The expansive manor house was built in the tradition of the châteaux in the Loire Valley.  The Rothschilds often bought original architectural elements from neglected castles and palaces and re-used these floors, fireplaces, ceilings, doors, and panellings in their own newly built castles and palaces, as, for example, in Mentmore Towers, Waddesdon Manor, the Château de Ferrières, and the Villa Ephrussi de Rothschild at Saint-Jean-Cap-Ferrat.

Yves Saint Laurent and his partner Pierre Bergé were much impressed by the interiors of the Château de Ferrières.  They held the decoration of the "Blue Saloon" as a model for the decoration of their own home.

The preferred style 

Mark Girouard discusses the development around the opulence of the Rothschild style: "the Rothschilds moved into the market for what were known at the time as 'curiosities' rather than 'antiques' in the 1840s... In the 1870s they came to dominate that market in Europe through their number and their enthusiasm, their increasing knowledge, [and] their apparently limitless resources".

The "Goût Rothschild" was until the end of the 1920s and in a less opulent way until the 1960s the preferred style of people who amassed their fortunes in the late 19th century. Families like the Vanderbilts, the Astors, the Rockefellers, the Du Ponts and others furnished their residences in New York City and Newport, Rhode Island in the "Goût Rothschild". During this period they bought whole interiors of French chateaux or English castles and country houses and shipped these elements of European aristocratic taste to the United States where they were installed in houses like The Breakers, Rosecliff, Marble House and others. The houses "Rosecliff" and "Marble House" were used as film locations in the 1974 film The Great Gatsby with Robert Redford and Mia Farrow.

In the house of Gertrude Vanderbilt Whitney on 871 Fifth Avenue in New York, Stanford White installed a 20-meter long ballroom of a French château which once belonged to a courtier of Louis XIV. The Great Hall was decorated with an immense antique fireplace removed from a French château and antique French tapestries of royal provenance bearing the monograms of Henry II of France and Diane de Poitiers.

The "Goût Rothschild" was especially popular in France, United Kingdom, and the United States.

Maison Jansen 
The Paris-based interior decoration company Maison Jansen was one of the leading companies whose designs came close to the "Goût Rothschild", though in a less opulent way. Among their clients were the administration of John F. Kennedy who engaged them to redesign the White House and the Duke and the Duchess of Windsor whose mansion in Paris they decorated.

Gallery

References 

Architectural styles
Interior design

Waddesdon Manor
Rothschild family residences